The 1996–97 Azadegan League was the sixth season of the Azadegan League that was won by Persepolis. The following is the final results of the Azadegan League's 1996–97 football season.

Final classification

Summary 

 Iranian football champions: Persepolis
 Relegated: Machine Sazi, Malavan, Shamoushak, Keshavarz
 Promoted: Fajr Sepasi, Saipa, Foolad, Shahrdari Tabriz

Player statistics

Top goal scorers 

18
 Ali Asghar Modir Roosta (Bahman)

References 
 

Azadegan League seasons
Iran
1996–97 in Iranian football